The streambank froglet or Flinders Ranges froglet (Crinia riparia) is a small, locally common, Australian ground-dwelling frog, of the family Myobatrachidae.

Description
The streambank froglet is a small frog (2.5 centimetres measured from snout to posterior). The colouring can be red, brown, tan, to drab olive green colour with many shades in between. Like its relatives Crinia signifera, this frog is of extremely variable markings, with great variety usually found within confined populations.  The dorsal and ventral surfaces are very variable. The dorsal surface may be smooth or warty.  The tympanum of this frog is not visible.
The colour under the throat is pale grey, the ventral surface backwards from the front legs is white with granular, mottled black.

Distribution
The streambank froglet is found only in the area around the Flinders Ranges and Gammon Ranges National Parks of central South Australia. It is found most often under rocks in springfed waterholes or cobbled pools in intermittently flowing streambeds.

Ecology and behaviour
Because of the seasonality of the rain, and periodic flooding, the tadpoles of these frogs have sucker mouthparts and a streamlined, flattened profile adapted to hold on to the rocks even in canyons where water can be funneled into flowing very rapidly. The call of the male is a barely audible 'creeeak-crek' described as sounding like a creaking hinge.

The diet of the species consists of small insects, much smaller in comparison to their size to most frogs.

References

  Database entry includes a range map and justification for why this species is of least concern
Cogger, H.G. 1979. Reptiles & Amphibians of Australia. A. H. & A. W. REED PTY LTD. 
Tyler, M.J. 1994. Australian Frogs A Natural History. Reed Books  
Department of Environment SA > EPA Frog Census > Crinia riparia
FrogsAustralia > Australian Frog Database > Crinia riparia

Crinia
Amphibians of South Australia
Amphibians described in 1965
Frogs of Australia